Romsås is a subway station on the Grorud Line of the Oslo Metro in the Grorud borough. It is located in the tunnel between Grorud and Rommen. It's in a mountain and smells moist. Like Ellingsrudåsen, Romsås has natural mountain walls. The architect Håkon Mjelva together with civil engineer Elliot Strømme and entrepreneur F. Selmer were awarded the "Concrete board for outstanding construction" in 1976.

References

External links

Oslo Metro stations in Oslo
Railway stations opened in 1974
1974 establishments in Norway